USS Leftwich (DD-984) was a Spruance-class destroyer built by the Ingalls Shipbuilding Division of Litton Industries at Pascagoula, Mississippi. She was named for Lieutenant Colonel William G. Leftwich, Jr., USMC (1931–1970), commander of the 1st Reconnaissance Battalion who was killed in action during Operation Imperial Lake in Quảng Nam Province South Vietnam on 18 November 1970 in a helicopter crash during the extraction of one of his reconnaissance teams. For this action, Lieutenant Colonel Leftwich received the Silver Star. Lieutenant Colonel Leftwich's medals and awards include: the Navy Cross, the Silver Star (posthumous), the Legion of Merit with Combat "V" and two gold stars, the Meritorious Service Medal, the Air Medal with one gold star, the Purple Heart with two gold stars, and various personal awards from the Republic of Vietnam.

Leftwich was laid down on 12 November 1976; and launched 8 April 1978; and commissioned 25 August 1979. The Commissioning speaker was the Chief of Naval Operations, Admiral Thomas B. Hayward, USN, who was a classmate of Bill Leftwich at the United States Naval Academy. Also in attendance at the Commissioning was H. Ross Perot, also a classmate of Lieutenant Colonel Leftwich. Both of Colonel Leftwich's sons and his widow attended the commissioning as well.

1979–1985 
Leftwich sailed from Pascagoula, MS the morning following the commissioning on 26 August 1979, en route via the Panama Canal for her homeport, Naval Station San Diego, from which she operated until March 1985.

On sailing, Hurricane David was threatening to make its way into the Gulf of Mexico, so shipping traffic on the transit to the Panama Canal was unusually light. Hurricane David did strike the Gulf coast, and was followed shortly after by Hurricane Frederic, which caused many ships at Ingalls Shipbuilding and Drydock to sortie into the hurricane.

The Leftwich made one of the fastest transits on record of the Panama Canal, making the passage without having to anchor. On sailing north in the Pacific Ocean, Leftwich found herself behind Hurricane Guillermo, which tracked along the western coast of Mexico, and then turned westward out into the Pacific, allowing the ship to arrive at her new homeport on schedule. While following the storm, Leftwich experienced  waves.

In the few months after arrival in San Diego, CA, Leftwich conducted "Shakedown" training under the guidance of Fleet Training Group, Pacific, in the San Diego Operations Area (OPAREA). In January 1980, Leftwich returned to Litton Industries at Pascagoula, MS for Warranty repairs and a Post-Shakedown Availability, which included the installation of the NATO Sea Sparrow and Harpoon missile system.

Both ships were conducting war games. Thomas A. Edison was at periscope depth when the collision occurred. Both ships suffered damage and returned to Subic Bay. Edison suffered damage to her sail, sail planes, and sonar dome. Leftwich suffered damage to her sonar dome, sonar dome "banjo" strut, and forward fuel storage tanks located in the forward hull. Two months later, Thomas A. Edison made a surface transit to Puget Sound Naval Shipyard for decommissioning without the damage having been repaired.

In 1984, Leftwich suffered hull and sonar window damage due to high-speed operations in heavy seas during fleet exercises on her deployment to Indian Ocean/Western Pacific (WESTPAC 1984).

1985–1998 
On 1 April 1985 Leftwich arrived at her new homeport of Naval Station Pearl Harbor, Hawaii. This remained her homeport for the rest of her career.

Leftwich, under the command of RADM (then Commander) Daniel Bowler, participated in Operation Nimble Archer on 19 October 1987. This was a response to Iran's 16 October 1987 attack on the MV Sea Isle City, a reflagged Kuwaiti oil tanker at anchor off Kuwait, with a Silkworm missile.

Leftwich with Helicopter Anti-Submarine Squadron 3 Detachment 5 embarked, arrived at Naval Station Pearl Harbor homeport. In 1990–91, under the command of Commander Patrick Garrett in support of Operation Desert Shield/Desert Storm, the destroyer conducted more than 200 merchant ship interceptions and one boarding. She was one of the first ships to fire BGM-109 Tomahawk cruise missiles during the conflict, and was the first combatant to conduct a wartime reload of Tomahawks for continued operations. With embarked helicopters and SEALs, she captured the first Iraqi territory repatriated in the war (an island off the coast of the al-Faw waterway), multiple enemy prisoners of war, and conducted 16 combat search and rescue cases. For her efforts in the Persian Gulf, The Leftwich and her crew were awarded the Navy Unit Commendation Ribbon and the Combat Action Ribbon.

During her career, Leftwich made eight deployments in the Western Pacific Ocean, Indian Ocean and Persian Gulf. She participated in Operation Nimble Archer, Desert Shield, and Desert Storm as well as operations in support of UN sanctions against Iraq.

Leftwich was decommissioned and stricken from the Naval Vessel Register on 27 March 1998.

Awards, Medals, and Commendations for ship and/or crew: (needs more help) Sept 87 – Nov 87, Jan 97 – Mar 97, Apr 97 Three Armed Forces Expeditionary Medals, Jan 91 – Feb 91 Combat Action Ribbon, Jan 91 – Feb 91 Navy Unit Commendation, Jul 81- Sept 81 Navy Expeditionary Medal, Jan 88 – Jun 89 & Jan 91 – Dec 92 Two Battle Effectiveness Awards, National Defense Service Medal, Dec 90 – Mar 91 Southwest Asia Service Medal, 8 Sea Service Ribbons, Dec 97 – Dec 98 Chief of Naval Operations Letter of Commendation, Kuwait Liberation Medal, Kuwait Liberation Medal (Saudi Arabia) 1990? Coast Guard Special Operations Ribbon (drug interdiction ops, relieved the Ingersoll)

Gallery

Notes

External links

navsource.org: USS Leftwich
united-states-navy.com: USS Leftwich
Webpage showing damage to Thomas A. Edison from Leftwich
LinkedIn.com Group: USS Leftwich DD-984
USS Leftwich Alumni Association page

 

Spruance-class destroyers
Cold War destroyers of the United States
Gulf War ships of the United States
1978 ships
Ships sunk as targets